Gerald Mitchell Rush (born August 7, 1942) is a former American football defensive tackle in the National Football League. He was drafted by the Detroit Lions in the second round of the 1965 NFL Draft. He played college football at Michigan State. He played his entire professional career with the Lions, retiring during training camp before the 1972 season.

References 

1942 births
Living people
Sportspeople from Pontiac, Michigan
Players of American football from Michigan
American football defensive tackles
Michigan State Spartans football players
Detroit Lions players